Ophisma variata is a moth of the family Noctuidae first described by William Schaus in 1901. It is found in South America, including Costa Rica and Brazil.

References

Ophiusina